The Desert Outlaw is a 1924 American silent Western film directed by Edmund Mortimer and starring Evelyn Brent. Prints of the film survive in the Czech Film Archive.

Cast
 Buck Jones as Sam Langdon
 Evelyn Brent as May Halloway
 DeWitt Jennings as Doc McChesney
 William Haines as Tom Halloway
 Claude Payton as Black Loomis
 William Gould as The Sheriff

References

External links 
 

1924 films
1924 Western (genre) films
American black-and-white films
Films directed by Edmund Mortimer
Fox Film films
Silent American Western (genre) films
1920s American films
1920s English-language films